Voetbalvereniging Concordia Rotterdam is a former Dutch amateur association football club from Rotterdam, founded on 11 August 1887.

The club won the first unofficial football championship in the Netherlands, hosted by the NVB, becoming the very first Dutch national champion in 1889.

The club merged on 12 June 1891 with the Rotterdam football club RC & FC Olympia to form the Rotterdamsche Cricket & Voetbal Vereniging Rotterdam

Multi-sport clubs in the Netherlands
Cricket teams in the Netherlands
Football clubs in the Netherlands
Football clubs in Rotterdam
Association football clubs established in 1887
1887 establishments in the Netherlands